Diffuse Infrared Background Experiment (DIRBE) was an experiment on NASA's COBE mission, to survey the diffuse infrared sky. Measurements were made with a reflecting telescope with 19 cm diameter aperture. The goal was to obtain brightness maps of the universe at ten frequency bands ranging from the near to far infrared (1.25 to 240 micrometer). Also, linear polarization was  measured at 1.25, 2.2, and 3.5 micrometers.  During the mission, the instrument could sample half the celestial sphere each day.

Mission details

The Cosmic Background Explorer (COBE) mission was launched in November 1989. The spacecraft contained liquid helium that cooled the DIRBE instrument to below 2K to allow it to image in the infrared wavelengths. Primary observation started December 11, 1989 and ran until September 21, 1990, when the liquid helium ran out. After that date only observations in the 1.25 to 4.9 micrometer bands could be carried out, at about 20% of original sensitivity. 

The DIRBE instrument was an absolute radiometer with an off-axis folded-Gregorian reflecting telescope, with 19 cm diameter aperture.

See also
 COBE  DIRBE
 Infrared astronomy
 Cosmic infrared background
 List of largest infrared telescopes

References

Other infrared surveys
 IRAS 1983
 WISE 2010
 Nancy Grace Roman Space Telescope 2027 (planned)

External links
NASA: DIRBE Overview
DIRBE data from here

Infrared imaging
Infrared telescopes
Astronomical surveys